Gleb Gurban (born 15 May 2001) is a Belarusian footballer who plays for Minsk.

References

External links

2001 births
Living people
Belarusian footballers
Association football defenders
FC Minsk players
FC Smolevichi players
FC Rukh Brest players
FC Orsha players